opened in Kariya, Aichi Prefecture, Japan in 1983. The collection focuses on local, modern, post-war, and contemporary art, and includes some 3,441 works by 168 artists, as of April 2020.

See also

 List of Cultural Properties of Japan - paintings (Aichi)
 List of Historic Sites of Japan (Aichi)
 Aichi Arts Center

References

External links
  Kariya City Art Museum
  Collection database

Kariya, Aichi
Art museums and galleries in Aichi Prefecture
Museums established in 1983
1983 establishments in Japan